The Altamurana is a breed of sheep from the province of Bari, in Puglia in southern Italy. It takes its name from the town of Altamura, in the Murge. It is of Asiatic, possibly Syrian, origin. It is raised mainly in the provinces of Bari and Foggia. It was formerly considered a triple-purpose breed, yielding meat, milk, and wool; it is now kept principally for milk production. It yields approximately 65 kg of milk per lactation, with on average 7.5% fat and 6.5% protein.

The Altamurana is one of the seventeen autochthonous Italian sheep breeds for which a genealogical herdbook is kept by the Associazione Nazionale della Pastorizia, the Italian national association of sheep-breeders. In 1984 the breed population was estimated at 190,000 head. In 2012 the total number recorded for the breed was 230; it is considered to be at risk of extinction.

See also 
 Altamura
 Altamura Man
 Pulo di Altamura
 Pane di Altamura

References 

Sheep breeds originating in Italy
Altamura
Ark of Taste foods